WWUS (104.1 FM), known as "US-1 Radio", is a radio station in the Florida Keys, based in Big Pine Key, Florida.

The station airs classic hits (R&B, pop, and rock music from the mid-1950s through the early-1990s) as well as talk programming.

WWUS covers the lower and middle Keys, and reaches the coast of Cuba near Havana. WWUS has a sister station (WCNK, 98.7 MHz, 100 kW) that plays contemporary country music and broadcasts also with 100 kW of power. These stations are also part of the family with WAVK from Marathon Key, part of Florida Keys Media, LLC.

History
Originally, US-1 Radio had its signal on 93.5 FM and broadcast with much lower power. Now it is one of the most powerful stations in the Florida Keys and a reference for news and hurricane warnings for sailors and citizens of the Keys.

In August 2013, Gamma Broadcasting, LLC reached a deal to sell its Florida Keys stations (including WWUS) to Florida Keys Media, LLC (a company controlled by Robert H. Holladay). The sale of WWUS and WCNK, at a price of $475,000, was consummated on January 31, 2014.

WWUS was honored with the 2018 National Association of Broadcasters Marconi Award for small market radio station of the year.  The news department was honored twice with the Radio Television Digital News Association National Edward R. Murrow Award, in 1999 for best small market radio continuing coverage of Hurricane Georges, and again in 2011 for best small market radio newscast, Evening Edition.

References

External links
US-1 Radio official website
Conch Country official website

WUS
Classic hits radio stations in the United States
Radio stations established in 1980